Francisco Amadeo Espinosa Ramos (born 1 April 1954) is a Mexican politician affiliated with the Labor Party. He served as Deputy of the LIX and LXI Legislatures of the Mexican Congress as a plurinominal representative, and previously served in LXI Legislature of the Congress of Chiapas.

References

1954 births
Living people
Politicians from Chiapas
Members of the Chamber of Deputies (Mexico)
Labor Party (Mexico) politicians
21st-century Mexican politicians
Members of the Congress of Chiapas
Deputies of the LXI Legislature of Mexico